The Admiral's Secret is a 1934 British comedy film directed by Guy Newall and starring Edmund Gwenn, James Raglan and Dorothy Black. It was based on a play by Cyril Campion and filmed at Twickenham Studios. The film's sets were designed by James Carter. A quota quickie, it was released by the American company RKO Pictures.

Premise 
In Devon a gang of Spanish criminals search for a trove of stolen gems hidden by a retired British Admiral.

Cast
 Edmund Gwenn as Admiral Fitzporter  
 James Raglan as Frank Bruce  
 Hope Davy as Pamela Fitzporter  
 Aubrey Mather as Captain Brooke 
 Edgar Driver as Sam Hawkins  
 Abraham Sofaer as Don Pablo y Gonzales  
 Dorothy Black as Donna Teresa  
 Andreas Malandrinos as Guido d'Elvira 
 D. J. Williams as Questa  
 Agnes Imlay as Mrs. Pinchcliffe

References

Bibliography
 Low, Rachael. Filmmaking in 1930s Britain. George Allen & Unwin, 1985.
 Wood, Linda. British Films, 1927-1939. British Film Institute, 1986.

External links 
 

1934 films
1934 comedy films
British comedy films
British black-and-white films
British films based on plays
Films directed by Guy Newall
Seafaring films
Films set in Devon
Films shot at Twickenham Film Studios
Quota quickies
1930s English-language films
1930s British films